Ezzatabad (also romanized as ‘Ezzatābād) is a village in Takab Rural District, in the Central District of Dargaz County, Razavi Khorasan Province, Iran. At the 2006 census, its population was 35, in 9 families.

References 

Populated places in Dargaz County